Fermín Cacho Ruiz (born 16 February 1969) is a Spanish track and field athlete, winner of the gold medal in the 1500m at the 1992 Summer Olympics in Barcelona and the silver medal in the 1500m at the 1996 Summer Olympics in Atlanta.

Born in Ágreda, Spain, Cacho had an enviable competitive record in the 1500 m, but it wasn't until late in his career that he produced a time of corresponding quality.

Cacho's first notable result came in 1990, when he finished second in the 1500 m at the European Indoor Championships in Glasgow. At the 1991 World Indoor Championships in Seville, Cacho finished again second in the 1500 m, behind Noureddine Morceli.

At the Olympic Games in Barcelona, Cacho was not considered a serious gold medal threat. But the Olympic 1500 m final was run at a very pedestrian pace, and Cacho positioned himself perfectly in the final lap, and outsprinted his rivals, with a last lap of 50.6 seconds, to win the gold medal in 3:40.12.

In 1993 at Stuttgart in World Championships, Cacho finished second, but took the 1500 m title at the European Championships in Helsinki in the next year. In World Championships at Gothenburg, Cacho only finished in eighth place.

After a relatively lean year in 1995, Cacho was back to his best in the early part of the 1996 season, leading up to the Olympic Games in Atlanta. Although Cacho was the defending Olympic 1500 m champion, the final in Atlanta was considered to be a match race between Morceli and Hicham El Guerrouj, who had filled the first two places at the previous year's World Championships. Approaching the completion of the third lap, Morceli was leading from El Guerrouj, when suddenly the Moroccan tripped and fell. In taking evasive action, Cacho was forced to leap over the fallen El Guerrouj, in a manoeuvre which he later estimated had lost him 5 metres of ground to Morceli, who had commenced his final lap sprint for the finish. Cacho chased Morceli around the last lap, but was unable to catch him. In the end Morceli won by 5 metres from the second-placed Cacho.

At the World Championships in Athens in 1997, Cacho won a silver medal again, and at the end of the same season he finally managed to run his world class time, when he finished second at the 1500 m behind El Guerrouj with a time of 3:28.95, which moved him to third on the all-time world list behind Morceli and El Guerrouj. He won the bronze medal at the 1998 European Championships in Budapest, and finished fourth in the World Championships at Seville in 1999. Cacho suffered an Achilles' tendon injury in 2000, causing him to miss the opportunity to add to his Olympic gold and silver medals at 2000 Summer Olympics in Sydney.

He held the European record at 1500 m with a time of 3:28.95 for 16 years (1997–2013), until Mo Farah broke it with a time of 3:28.81.

International competitions

1Representing Europe

Personal bests
Outdoor
800 metres – 1:45.37 (Albacete 1991)
1000 metres – 2:16.13 (Andújar 1993)
1500 metres – 3:28.95 (Zürich 1997)
One mile – 3:49.56 (Oslo 1996)
3000 metres – 7:37.02 (Seville 1999)
5000 metres – 13:46.65 (Seville 2002)
Indoor
800 metres – 1:46.79 (Seville 1993)
1000 metres – 2:20.18 (Madrid 1992)
1500 metres – 3:35.29 (Seville 1991)
3000 metres – 7:36.61 (Stuttgart 1996)

References

 Spanish Olympic Committee

All-Athletics profile

1969 births
Living people
Sportspeople from the Province of Soria
Spanish male middle-distance runners
Olympic athletes of Spain
Olympic gold medalists for Spain
Olympic silver medalists for Spain
Athletes (track and field) at the 1992 Summer Olympics
Athletes (track and field) at the 1996 Summer Olympics
World Athletics Championships athletes for Spain
World Athletics Championships medalists
European Athletics Championships medalists
Medalists at the 1996 Summer Olympics
Medalists at the 1992 Summer Olympics
Olympic gold medalists in athletics (track and field)
Olympic silver medalists in athletics (track and field)
Mediterranean Games silver medalists for Spain
Mediterranean Games medalists in athletics
Athletes (track and field) at the 1993 Mediterranean Games